The Stan Freberg Show was a weekly radio comedy show that ran on the CBS Radio Network for fifteen episodes in 1957 from July 14 through October 20. The show, starring comedian Stan Freberg and featuring the vocal talents of Daws Butler, June Foray and Peter Leeds, Peggy Taylor as the resident singer, and the musical direction of Billy May. The show aired in the 7:30 p.m. (ET) time slot following repeats of The Jack Benny Program {"The Best Of Benny"} on Sundays. The show was produced by Pete Barnum.

Despite its short run, the show contained some running gags and stock jokes, from Freberg's ambivalence toward Madison Avenue (faux advertisements for "Puffed Grass" and "Food," as well as the sketch "Gray Flannel Hatful of Teenage Werewolves") to the interviews with a sneaker-wearing Abominable Snowman. Freberg also developed an elaborate parody of Lawrence Welk's then-current Dodge Dancing Party, which he later released (in a somewhat shorter form) as a single, "Wun'erful, Wun'erful! (Sides uh-one & uh-two)." (He would reprise the Welk impersonation for his final show, in which the fictional Welk tersely mocks Freberg's cancellation.)  

By the thirteenth episode, it was clear that The Stan Freberg Show was suffering from a lack of advertiser interest (perhaps helped by Freberg's werewolf comparisons). According to Freberg's autobiography, It Only Hurts When I Laugh, two different cigarette companies offered to sponsor the program, but Stan turned them down; because no other advertisers were willing to provide primary or alternate sponsorship on Freberg's terms, CBS canceled the series after fifteen episodes. According to author Joe Bevilacqua, it was the last American network radio show to devote itself purely to comedy.

1958's The Best of the Stan Freberg Shows, a recording of collected material from the show, won the first 1959 Grammy Award for Best Spoken Word Album.

References

External links

American comedy radio programs
American radio sketch shows
1957 radio programme debuts
1957 radio programme endings
1950s American radio programs
CBS Radio programs
Children's sketch comedy
Works by Stan Freberg